The Four Corners is a region in the southwestern United States where the corners of  Colorado, Utah, New Mexico, and Arizona meet.

Four Corners or 4 Corners may also refer to:

Places

Canada
 Four corners (Canada), the point where Manitoba, Saskatchewan, Northwest Territories, and Nunavut theoretically meet
 Four Corners, in Malton, Mississauga, Ontario
 Four Corners, Sudbury, Ontario

United States
Listed alphabetically by state
 Four Corners Monument, a marker at the Four Corners intersection of Arizona, Colorado, New Mexico, and Utah
 Four Corners, California (disambiguation)
 Four Corners, Contra Costa County, California
 Four Corners, Florida
 Four Presidents Corners, Indiana
 Four Corners, Maryland, a neighborhood in Silver Spring
 Four Corners, Dorchester, Boston, a residential area within Boston, Massachusetts
 Four Corners/Geneva station, a commuter rail station in Boston, Massachusetts
 Four Corners, Minnesota, an unincorporated community in northeast Minnesota
 Four Corners, Montana, a census-designated place near the city of Bozeman
 Four Corners (Newark), a historic district in Newark, New Jersey
 Four Corners, Pelham Manor, New York, the intersection of Boston Post Road and Pelhamdale Road
 Four Corners, Vestal, New York, the intersection of the Vestal Parkway and Main Street
 Four Corners, Lincoln County, Oklahoma, an unincorporated community
 Four Corners, Texas County, Oklahoma, an unincorporated community
 Four Corners, Oregon, a census-designated place
 Four Corners, Jackson County, Oregon, an unincorporated community
 Four Corners of Law, an intersection in Charleston, South Carolina
 Four Corners, Texas, a census-designated place in suburban Houston
 Four Corners, Wisconsin (disambiguation), unincorporated communities
 Four Corners, Wyoming, an unincorporated town located in the Black Hills of northeastern Wyoming

Elsewhere
 Four corners of the world (disambiguation)

Arts, entertainment, and media

Films
Four Corners (film), a 2013 South African film
Four Corners, a film by the American filmmaker James Benning

Television
Four Corners (Australian TV program), from the Australian Broadcasting Corporation that debuted in 1961
Four Corners (American TV series), a 1998 American television series
 "Four Corners", a season 8 episode of the TV series ER
The Four Corners (TV series), a 1957 Canadian television series

Other uses in arts, entertainment, and media
 4 Corners (group), a New Zealand hip-hop group formed in 1998
Four Corners (album), a 1987 album by Yellowjackets
Four corners (game), a children's game

Brands and enterprises
Four Corners Gallery, an art gallery in London, England
Four Corners Office/Retail Complex, Houston, Texas, US

Other uses

Four corners (law), a term in contract law relating to exclusion clauses
 Four Corners (patience), a solitaire card game
 Four corners (teaching method), a teaching and learning strategy
 Four corners offense, a style of basketball play

See also
 Four-Corner Method, a method of encoding Chinese characters.
 Porter's four corners model, a competitive analysis method
 Quadripoint, a place where the borders of four distinct countries or territories meet
 Simpang Empat (disambiguation), several places in Malaysia and Indonesia (Bahasa for "Four Corners")